(24 April 1940 – 7 March 2019) was a Japanese photographer who "[combined] a pure appreciation of Japanese customs with a sharp investigative eye".

Life and career
Born—as Kazumasa Suda ( Suda Kazumasa)—in Kanda, Tokyo on 24 April 1940, Suda dropped out of Toyo University in 1961 and entered Tokyo College of Photography, from which he graduated in 1962.

From 1967 to 1971, Suda worked as the cameraman of the theatrical group Tenjō Sajiki, under Shūji Terayama. He worked as a freelance photographer from 1971. His first photobook, Fūshi kaden, was named after a treatise by Zeami Motokiyo; it won a Photographic Society of Japan newcomer's award in 1976. His fourth, Ningen no kioku, won the Domon Ken Award in 2014.

Suda was a professor at Osaka University of Arts.

He died at the age of 78 on 7 March 2019.

Books by Suda

Fūshi kaden. Sonorama Shashin Sensho 16. Tokyo: Asahi Sonorama, 1978. .
Waga-Tōkyō hyaku. Nikon Salon Books 5. Tokyo: Nikkor Club, 1979. .
Inu no hana: Kimagure, shashin, sanpo. Tokyo: IBC, 1991. .
Ningen no kioku. Tokyo: Creo, 1996. .
Akai hana. Tokyo: Wides, 2000. . Early photographs.
Suda Issei shashinten "Fūshi kaden". JCII Photo Salon library 165. Tokyo: JCII, 2005.
Min'yō sanga. Tokyo: Tōseisha, 2007. .
Kado no tabakoya made no tabi. Tokyo: Place M, 2011. .
The Work of a Lifetime: Photographs 1968–2006. Berlin: Only Photography, 2011. .
Fūshi kaden = Fushikaden. Tokyo: Akio Nagasawa, 2012. .
Rubber. Tokyo: M-Books, 2012. . Photographs of rubber fetishism.
Sen-kyūhyaku-nanajūgo Miura Misaki = 1975 Miuramisaki. Tokyo: Akio Nagasawa, 2012. .
Sparrow Island. Portland: Nazraeli, 2012. . Photographs of Suzumejima, an islet in Chiba.
松之物語 = Monogatari of Pines. Taiwan: 亦安工作室, 2013. .
Mumei no danjo: Tōkyō 1976–8. Tokyo: Akio Nagasawa, 2013. 48 pages; edition of 50 copies. 
Early Works 1970–1975. Tokyo: Akio Nagasawa, 2013. .
Nagi no hira = Fragments of Calm. Tokyo: Tōseisha, 2013. .
Tōkyō-kei = Tokyokei. Tokyo: Zen Foto Gallery, 2013. 
Waga-Tōkyō hyaku = Waga Tokyo 100. Tokyo: Zen Foto Gallery, 2013. .
Osorezan e = The Journey to Osorezan. Tokyo: Zen Foto Gallery, 2013. . Photographs of Osorezan.
Sōmatō no yō ni: Kamagasaki 2000/2014 = Kamagasaki Magic Lantern. Tokyo: Zen Foto Gallery, 2015. . Photographs of Kamagasaki, Osaka.
Childhood Days. Tokyo: Akio Nagasawa, 2015. .
Rei. Tokyo: Akio Nagasawa, 2015. . Photographs of mannequins.
Bōsō fūdoki. Kamakura: Super Labo, 2015. . Photographs of Bōsō.
Suda Issei shashinten "Min'yō sanga". JCII Photo Salon library 294. Tokyo: JCII, 2016. .
Suddenly. Tokyo: Place M, 2016. .
Sein. Kamakura: Super Labo, 2017. .
Kannagara = Kan-nagara. Tokyo: Place M, 2017. .
Nichijō no danpen = Fragment of Everyday Life. Kyoto: Seigensha, 2018. .
Mōmaku chokketsu yubisaki me kamera = The Mechanical Retina on My Fingertips. Tokyo: Zen Foto Gallery, 2018. . Text in Japanese, English and Chinese.
Gankotoshi. Tokyo: Akio Nagasawa, 2019. .
Entotsu no aru fūkei. Tokyo: Place M, 2019. .
Tokyo Modern Pictorial. Tokyo: Zen Foto Gallery, 2020. .
78. Paris: Chose Commune, 2020. .
New Life. Tokyo: Akio Nagasawa, 2020. .
Eden. Tokyo: Place M, 2020. .
My Japan. Amsterdam: Fw, 2021. Edited by Anne Ruygt. . With an essay by Frits Gierstberg.
Mumei no danjo ( = Anonymous Man and Woman. Tokyo: Akio Nagasawa, 2021. 100 photographs from the series made in the late 1970s. 160 pages; edition of 600 copies.
Fūshi kaden = Exhibition Fushikaden. Ningbo: Jiazazhi, 2020. 71 photographs on 72 pages.
Family Diary = Kazoku nikki. Marseille: Chose Commune, 2021. . With text in French, English and Japanese.
Kantō fūtan = The Sketch of Kanto Area. Tokyo: Akio Nagasawa, April 2022. Edition of 600 copies. 120 pages. Hardcover. 207mm x 216mm. No ISBN.
Holy Night. Marseille: Chose Commune, 2022. . With text in French, English and Japanese.

Notes

References

General references
 Suda Issei / Issei Suda. Nihon no Shashinka 40. Tokyo: Iwanami, 1998. .

External links
Suda's profile at Shashasha

1940 births
2019 deaths
Japanese photographers
People from Tokyo
Photography academics
Street photographers
Tokyo College of Photography alumni